Dubhghall mac Ruaidhrí (died 1268) was a leading figure in the thirteenth-century Kingdom of the Isles, on the West Coast of Scotland. He was a son of Ruaidhrí mac Raghnaill, and thus a member of Clann Ruaidhrí. Dubhgall was the last Gaelic King of Mann.

Dubhghall was also active in Ireland, and is recorded to have conducted military operations against the English in Connacht. In 1259, the year after his victory over the English Sheriff of Connacht, Dubhghall's daughter was married to Aodh na nGall Ó Conchobhair, son of the reigning King of Connacht. This woman's tocher consisted of a host of gallowglass warriors commanded by Dubhghall's brother, Ailéan. This record appears to be the earliest notice of such soldiers in surviving sources. The epithet borne by Dubhghall's son-in-law——can be taken to mean "of the Hebrideans", and appears to refer to the Hebridean military support that contributed to his success against the English.

The careers of Dubhghall and his Clann Somhairle kinsman, Eóghan Mac Dubhghaill, exemplify the difficulties faced by the leading Norse-Gaelic lords in the Isles and along western seaboard of Scotland. In theory, these regions formed part of the greater Norwegian commonwealth. However, during the tenures of Dubhghall and Eóghan, successive thirteenth-century Scottish kings succeeded in extending their own authority into these Norse-Gaelic regions. Whilst Eóghan eventually submitted to the Scots, Dubhghall steadfastly supported the Norwegian cause. Recognised as a king by the reigning Hákon Hákonarson, King of Norway, Dubhghall was one of the leading figures in the failed 1263 campaign against the Scots. Although Dubhghall is last recorded resisting the encroachment of Scottish overlordship, the Scots succeeded in wrenching control of the Isles from the Norwegians in 1266. Dubhghall may have died in exile in Norway, where his son, Eiríkr, was an active baron.

Clann Ruaidhrí

Dubhghall was a son of Ruaidhrí mac Raghnaill, Lord of Kintyre in Scotland, the eponym of Clann Ruaidhrí, a branch of Clann Somhairle. By the second decade of the thirteenth century, Ruaidhrí may have been the leading member of Clann Somhairle.

The little that is known of Dubhghall's father suggests that, much like Dubhghall himself, Ruaidhrí operated against the looming threat of Scottish overlordship of Argyll and the Isles. Although Ruaidhrí appears to have originally held power in Kintyre, the Scottish Crown seems to have expelled him from the region in the 1220s. In Ruaidhrí's place, Alexander II, King of Scotland appears to have planted Ruaidhrí's younger brother, Domhnall, an apparently more palatable candidate from the Scots' perspective. This dramatic projection of Scottish royal authority may have also resulted in the king's establishment of the Clann Dubhghaill lordship of Argyll which appears on record not long afterwards. By the midpoint of the thirteenth century, Clann Dubhghaill—yet another branch of Clann Somhairle—was represented by Eóghan Mac Dubhghaill, whilst Dubhghall himself represented Clann Ruaidhrí.

Although it is possible that Dubhghall's power base was located in Garmoran and perhaps the Uists, there is uncertainty as to how and when these territories entered into the possession of his family. Later leading members of Clann Ruaidhrí certainly possessed these lands, but evidence of custody before the mid thirteenth century is lacking. In theory, these territories could have been awarded to the kindred following the Scots' acquisition of the Isles in 1266. On the other hand, the family's position in the Isles may have stemmed from its marital alliance with the Crovan dynasty, an affiliation undertaken at some point before Ruaidhrí's apparent expulsion from Kintyre.

Alignment with the Norwegian Crown

In 1248, both Dubhghall and Eóghan are stated by the thirteenth-century Hákonar saga Hákonarsonar to have arrived in Norway, with both men seeking the kingship of the northern  from Hákon Hákonarson, King of Norway. The entirety of the —an Old Norse term meaning "Southern Islands"—roughly equates to the Hebrides and Mann. The precise jurisdiction that Dubhghall and Eóghan competed for is uncertain. For example, the northern Hebridean islands of Lewis and Harris and Skye appear to have been held by the Crovan dynasty, then represented by the reigning Haraldr Óláfsson, King of Mann and the Isles. In about 1241, the dominion of the latter appears to have been defined by Hákon as the islands which had been previously ruled by Haraldr's father, uncle, and grandfather. Hákon, therefore, appears to have not only deliberately excluded the island territories ruled by Clann Somhairle, but limited the possibility of Haraldr becoming drawn into alignment with Scottish interests as some leading members of Clann Somhairle had been. Eóghan and Dubhghall, therefore, may have contended for all the islands excluded from Haraldr's allotment. It is conceivable that Eóghan and Dubhghall sought kingship of the same jurisdiction that Hákon had awarded to Óspakr-Hákon about a decade before—a region which could have included some or all of the islands possessed by Clann Somhairle.

Although 1247 was also the year of Hákon's royal coronation, and it is possible that the arrival of the Clann Somhairle dynasts was a result of the reimposition of Norwegian overlordship in the Isles, another reason for their arrival may relate to the death of a certain Mac Somhairle, an apparent member of Clann Somhairle, slain whilst resisting an English invasion of Tír Chonaill in 1247. Merely a year before, Haraldr seems to have submitted to Henry III, King of England, and it is possible that Hákon had consequently recognised Mac Somhairle's kingship in the Isles in retaliation to Haraldr's acceptance of English overtures. If so, Dubhghall and Eóghan may have both sought to succeed their kinsman in the Isles. In fact, Dubhghall's father may well be identical to Mac Somhairle. Certainly, Dubhghall's presence in Norway suggests that Ruaidhrí was indeed dead by this date.

An alliance with a ruler of the Isles would have certainly benefited Henry's ongoing military operations in Ireland, and it is possible that it was Haraldr's pact with him that had prompted Mac Somhairle's involvement against the English in Ireland. In fact, Clann Somhairle may have faced immediate repercussions for their alignment with the Norwegian Crown. For example, English financial records for 1248 reveal that Walter Bisset was tasked to fortify a castle along the Scottish coast. This castle appears to have been that of Dunaverty, seated upon the southern coast of Kintyre, which could indicate that Walter's Ulster-based actions in Kintyre were undertaken as a means to divide the Isles, isolating Mann from the Hebrides.

Repercussions from the Scottish Crown

Whilst Dubhghall and Eóghan were in Norway, Hákon appears to have attempted to bring Haraldr back onside; and in so doing, Hákon gave away his widowed daughter in marriage to Haraldr. Unfortunately for Hákon and his designs in the Isles, the newly wedded couple were lost at sea whilst sailing from Norway to the Isles. Not only did this calamity deprive the Islesmen of a capable king, but it cost the Norwegian Crown a closely connected advocate in the region. Upon learning of the catastrophe, Hákon immediately sent Eóghan west-over-sea to temporarily take up the kingship of the Isles on his behalf. The fact that the thirteenth- to fourteenth-century Chronicle of Mann reports that Haraldr's brother, Rǫgnvaldr, succeeded to the kingship in 1249, could indicate that Rǫgnvaldr and Eóghan shared a degree of authority in the Isles. In any event, Eóghan was not only a Norwegian dependant in the Isles, but an eminent Scottish magnate on the mainland. Although the Scottish Crown appears to have attempted to purchase the Isles earlier that decade, Alexander II launched an invasion of Argyll, in the summer of 1249, directed at the very heart of the Clann Dubhghaill lordship. The apparent cooling of relations between Eóghan and Alexander II, along with Haraldr's demise, the resultant kin-strife over Haraldr's succession, and Eóghan's acceptance of royal powers on Hákon's behalf, could all have spurred the Scots' offensive. In the course of this offensive, Alexander II demanded that Eóghan renounce his allegiance to Hákon, and ordered him to hand over certain mainland and island fortresses. Eóghan stubbornly refused, and the unfolding crisis only ended with the Scottish king's untimely death in July 1249.

Eóghan dearly suffered as a result of conflicting obligations the Norwegians and Scots. In fact, it is probable that he had been utterly dispossessed by the Scots a result of their invasion. Although the reasons why Hákon originally awarded him the kingship over Dubhghall are unknown; for whatever reason, the latter appears to have been regarded as a less preferable candidate at the time. Eóghan's apparent displacement at the hands of Alexander II, however, could well have upended the hierarchy of Clann Somhairle. For instance, a particular entry preserved by the Icelandic annals states that, within the very year that Eóghan was forced from Argyll by the Scots, Dubhghall himself "took kingship" in the Isles. This record could reveal that Dubhghall and Eóghan shared kingship in the Hebrides, or that Dubhghall assumed the kingship from a severely weakened Eóghan. In fact, Eóghan's actions of the following year—when he and Magnús Óláfsson, a member of the Crovan dynasty, unsuccessfully attempted to seized control of Mann—could further indicate he was in dire straits.

Magnús, Dubhghall, and Eóghan were back in Scandinavia in 1253, as Hákonar saga Hákonarsonar reveals that the latter two took part in the Norwegians' royal campaign against the Danish Crown. By 1255, however, Eóghan was reconciled with the Scottish Crown. The fact that Dubhghall was later regarded as king in Scandinavian sources could indicate that Hákon's original award of the title to Eóghan in 1248 was reversed upon the restoration of Eóghan's Scottish lordship. However, the record of Dubhghall holding kingship as early as 1249, coupled with Eóghan's attempt to gain control of Mann in 1250, and the fact that both men were identified as kings whilst campaigning with the Norwegians royal forces in 1253, could indicate that Hákon had originally intended for both men to hold kingship, possibly with Dubhghall in the Hebrides and Eóghan on Mann.

Involvement in Ireland

In 1258, the fifteenth- to sixteenth-century Annals of Connacht, the sixteenth-century Annals of Loch Cé, and the seventeenth-century Annals of the Four Masters indicate that Dubhghall, at the command of a formidable fleet, sailed to Connemara on the western Irish coast, where he is stated to have robbed a merchant ship. No doubt as a result of this spoliation, the sources further reveal that Jordan d'Exeter, the English Sheriff of Connacht, pursued Dubhghall's fleet and was slain along with many of his men in the culminating clash. Enriched with plunder, Dubhghall is then stated to have returned home from this piratical cruise. The next entry preserved by the Annals of Connacht concerns an extraordinary assembly of Aodh na nGall Ó Conchobhair, Tadhg Ó Briain, and Brian Ó Néill, King of Tír Eoghain, within the year. It was at this convention, at Caol Uisce on the River Erne, that Aodh—son of the King of Connacht—and Tadhg—son of the King of Thomond—relinquished their claims to the high-kingship of Ireland in favour of Brian, who was then proclaimed high king. The latter was then in midst of campaigning against a temporarily weakened English Earldom of Ulster, and closely allied with Aodh in his cause.

The following year, Dubhghall again appears on record in Irish affairs, as the Annals of Connacht, the Annals of Loch Cé, and the Annals of the Four Masters reveal that Aodh travelled to Derry and married a daughter of Dubhghall, and thereby received a tocher that included one hundred and sixty gallowglass warriors commanded by Dubhghall's brother, Ailéan. The marital alliance between Aodh and Dubhghall was conducted at the main port within Brian's realm, a site indicating that the union—along with the assembly and naval operations of the previous year—was part of a carefully coordinated plan to tackle English power in the north west of Ireland.

Unfortunately for these confederates, Tadhg was dead by 1259, and the combined forces of Aodh and Brian were utterly crushed in battle at Downpatrick in 1260, with Brian amongst the slain. Despite this catastrophe, the phenomenon of eminent Irish lords importing heavily armed mercenaries from the Isles and western Scotland became more prevalent in the later part of the century, and helped to even the military superiority enjoyed by English forces over native Irish troops. The association of Aodh with Dubhghall appears to have earned Aodh the epithet  (literally "of the Foreigners", but perhaps meaning "of the Hebrideans"). In fact, there may be evidence to suggest that Brian had also been married to a member of Clann Somhairle, perhaps a daughter of Eóghan himself.

Collapse of Norwegian sovereignty

With the death of Alexander II in 1249 the Scottish invasion of the Argyll and the Isles came to an abrupt end. About a decade later, the latter's son and royal successor, Alexander III, came of age and took steps to continue his father's westward expansion. In 1262, the year after yet another failed attempt by the Scottish Crown to purchase the Isles, Hákonar saga Hákonarsonar reports that the Scots lashed out against the Islesmen in a particularly savage attack upon the inhabitants of Skye. Thus provoked, Hákon assembled an enormous fleet—described by the Icelandic annals as the largest force to have ever set sail from Norway—to reassert Norwegian sovereignty along the north and west coasts of Scotland. Amongst the distinguished men stated to have manned Hákon's own vessel was Dubhghall's own son, Eiríkr. In July 1263, this armada disembarked from Norway, and by mid August, Hákon reaffirmed his overlordship in Shetland and Orkney, forced the submission of Caithness, and arrived in the Hebrides.

According to the saga, Hákon was met in the region by Magnús (by then the reigning King of Mann and the Isles) and Dubhghall himself. As the fleet made its way southwards, Hákon sent a detachment of vessels under the command of Dubhghall and Magnús to harry Kintyre whilst Hákon himself made landfall on Gigha. It is evident that Magnús and Dubhghall were tasked with bringing Aonghus Mór Mac Domhnaill and Murchadh Mac Suibhne onto the king's side. In early September, the reinforced fleet of Norwegians and Islesmen entered the Firth of Clyde.

After peace talks broke down between Hákon and Alexander III, the saga identifies Magnús, Dubhghall, Ailéan, Aonghus Mór, and Murchadh himself, as the commanders of a detachment of Islesmen and Norwegians who entered Loch Long, portaged across land into Loch Lomond, and ravaged the surrounding region of the Lennox. According various versions of the saga, this contingent consisted of either forty or sixty ships—a considerable portion of Hákon's fleet. There is reason to suspect that this strike is evidence that the Norwegians and Islesmen were directing their fury at the territories of the powerful Stewart kindred. Furthermore, by penetrating into the Earldom of Lennox, and possibly striking further east inland, Hákon's adherents would have been encroaching into the Earldom of Menteith.

Meanwhile, at the beginning of October, Hákon's main force clashed with the Scots at Largs, and withdrew into the Hebrides. Once regrouped with the detachment of Islesmen, the saga records that Hákon rewarded his overseas supporters. Since Eóghan had refused to aid the Norwegians cause, Dubhghall and Ailéan were awarded his forfeited island territories. A certain Ruðri is stated to have received Bute, whilst Murchadh got Arran.

A commonality amongst some of Hákon's most prominent and steadfast supporters from the Isles was their close connections with Ireland. In fact, the saga reveals that Hákon had previously received overtures from the Irish, requesting the Norwegians combat the English in exchange for overlordship of Ireland. Although the saga reports that the king was eventually dissuaded from such Irish offers, and died in Orkney that December, the Annals of Loch Cé and the Annals of Connacht report his death in context of coming to Ireland. There is reason to suspect that Magnús had once been aligned with Brian; and the fact that the latter's ally Aodh was aligned with Dubhghall and Ailéan strongly suggests that it was Aodh himself who had requested assistance from the Norwegian Crown. In fact, the invitation itself may be one of the most innovative ideas in the history of thirteenth-century Gaelic Ireland. Certainly, Aodh's relationship with Clann Ruaidhrí, and his apparent overtures to the Norwegian Crown, illustrate the radical measures that certain Irish lords were prepared to take in order to overcome English dominance in Ireland. The fact that Dubhghall, Ailéan, and Magnús, were unequivocal supporters of the Norwegian cause against Scottish encroachment in the Isles, and simultaneously involved in Irish affairs, suggests that they were the unidentified men that Alexander attempted to prevent from entering Ireland just prior to the battle at Downpatrick.

Although Hákonar saga Hákonarsonar declares that the operation was an overwhelming triumph, it seems to have been an utter failure instead. Not only did Hákon fail to break Scottish power, but Alexander III seized the initiative the following year, and oversaw a series of invasions into the Isles and northern Scotland. Recognising this dramatic shift in royal authority, Magnús submitted to Alexander III within the year, and in so doing, symbolised the complete collapse of Norwegian sovereignty in the Isles. Dubhghall, on the other hand, contrasted many of his compatriots from the Isles, and stubbornly refused to submit to the Scottish Crown. In fact, the thirteenth-century Magnúss saga lagabœtis reveals that he continued to resist, and conducted military operations against the Scots in Caithness. This source states that Dubhghall attacked the Scots whilst they were extracting a fine from the Caithnessmen, and in so doing seized much of this treasure and slew many of the Scots. This amercement may correspond to one noted by the Scottish exchequer rolls in which two hundred head of cattle were extracted from the Caithnessmen. Whatever the case, in 1266, almost three years after Hákon's abortive campaign, terms of peace were finally agreed upon between the Scottish and Norwegian administrations. Specifically, with the conclusion of the Treaty of Perth in July, Hákon's son and successor, Magnús Hákonarson, King of Norway, formally resigned all rights to Mann and the islands on the western coast of Scotland. In so doing, the territorial dispute over Scotland's western maritime region was finally settled.

Dubhghall died in 1268. His death is recorded by the Icelandic annals, and various Irish annals, such as the Annals of Loch Cé, the Annals of the Four Masters, and the Annals of Connacht. The latter source styles him "King of Argyll", a title that may add weight to the possibility that Mac Somhairle was indeed his father. Whatever the case, Dubhghall's demise is not noticed by existing Scottish sources, and it is possible that he died in Norway. Certainly, Eiríkr remained loyal to the Norwegian cause, and was himself a prominent baron of this northern realm. From the 1260s, Clann Ruaidhrí disappears from the Scottish historical record. When the kindred finally reemerges in 1275, it is in the person of Dubhghall's brother, Ailéan, a man who was by then a prominent Scottish magnate, and representative of Clann Ruaidhrí. Unlike Dubhghall, Ailéan is not accorded any title in contemporary sources. Nevertheless, there is reason to suspect that the title  accorded to an apparent Clann Ruaidhrí chieftain in 1318—a man possibly identical to one of Ailéan's sons—was that of Ailéan's lordship and inherited from him. In any case, it was during Ailéan's tenure that the kindred assimilated into the Scottish realm, and his descendants continued to be factors in Scottish history well into the fourteenth century. Another son of Dubhghall, Donnchadh, appears on record in the late thirteenth century.

Ancestry

Notes

Citations

References

Primary sources

Secondary sources

External links

1268 deaths
13th-century Norwegian people
13th-century rulers of the Kingdom of the Isles
13th-century Scottish people
Clann Ruaidhrí
Gaels
Rulers of the Kingdom of the Isles
Scottish clan chiefs